Nikolayevka is a rural locality (a selo) in Alexeyevsky District, Belgorod Oblast, Russia. The population was 119 as of 2010. There is 1 street.

References 

Rural localities in Alexeyevsky District, Belgorod Oblast
Biryuchensky Uyezd